Darker Days Ahead is the second album by American deathgrind band Terrorizer. It was released on August 22, 2006, by Century Media, seventeen years after their 1989 debut World Downfall. Darker Days Ahead is Terrorizer's final album recorded with guitarist Jesse Pintado, who died five days after its release due to liver failure.

Track listing

Personnel

Terrorizer
Anthony Rezhawk – vocals
Jesse Pintado – guitars
Tony Norman – bass
Pete Sandoval – drums, piano ("Ghost Train")

Production
Juan "Punchy" Gonzalez – production, engineering, mixing, mastering

References

2006 albums
Terrorizer albums
Century Media Records albums